Trengereid is a village in the borough of Arna in the municipality of Bergen in Hordaland county, Norway.

History
In 1895, Johan Jebsen established a factory in Trengereid. The factory produced ribbons and lace, and it had its own power plant. Today the Trengereid power plant has been modernized and is operated by BKK. Previously there was also mining at nearby Risnes, where lime was extracted.

Infrastructure

Above Trengereid there is a roundabout that routes traffic between Norwegian County Road 7 to Hardanger and European route E16 eastwards to Voss and westward to Bergen's city center, or via a bypass road down to Trengereid.

Trengereid Station on the Bergen Line between Bergen and Myrdal via Voss stands below the village.

References

Populated places in Bergen